Private Francis A. Bishop was an American soldier who fought in the American Civil War. Bishop received the country's highest award for bravery during combat, the Medal of Honor, for his action during the Battle of Spotsylvania Court House in Virginia on 12 May 1864. He was honored with the award on 1 December 1864.

Biography
Bishop was born in Bradford County, Pennsylvania. He enlisted into the 57th Pennsylvania Infantry on 15 September 1861. After his Medal of Honor event he also participated in other event. He attained the rank of corporal and mustered out on 29 June 1865. He moved to Retsil, Washington after the war and died there. His remains are interred in Blanchard, Michigan.

Medal of Honor citation

See also

List of American Civil War Medal of Honor recipients: A–F

References

People of Pennsylvania in the American Civil War
Union Army officers
United States Army Medal of Honor recipients
American Civil War recipients of the Medal of Honor
People from Bradford County, Pennsylvania